Chen Yu-chie is a Taiwanese chemist and is a Professor of Chemistry in the National Chiao Tung University, Hsinchu, Taiwan.  She received her Ph.D. from Montana State University (United States).

Research
Chen's research interests include biological mass spectrometry, analytical nanotechnology, and nanobiotechnology.

Achievements
Chen is the inventor of Ultrasonication-Assisted Spray Ionization (UASI),  as well as Contactless Atmospheric Pressure Ionization (Contactless API), and one of the inventors of the surface-assisted laser desorption/ionization (SALDI) techniques for mass spectrometric analysis of chemical molecules.

References

Living people
Montana State University alumni
Taiwanese chemists
Academic staff of the National Chiao Tung University
Mass spectrometrists
Taiwanese women chemists
Year of birth missing (living people)